Christian Eklund (born July 24, 1977 in Haninge, Stockholm County) is a retired professional Swedish ice hockey player. He played a total of 429 Elitserien games as a left wing for Djurgårdens IF. Eklund retired in 2013 after suffering a neck injury. He was awarded player of the season for the 2010–11 season by Järnkaminerna, the official supporter club of Djurgården.

He is father to William Eklund, also a professional ice hockey player.

Career statistics

References

External links

1977 births
Living people
People from Haninge Municipality
Djurgårdens IF Hockey players
Huddinge IK players
IK Oskarshamn players
Swedish ice hockey left wingers
Swedish expatriate ice hockey players in Germany
Tingsryds AIF players
Sportspeople from Stockholm County